Naba Kumar Saraniya alias Heera Saraniya, also spelled as Heera Sarania and Hira Sarania, alias Naba Deka (born 1 May 1969) is an Indian politician who is serving as the  Member of parliament, Lok Sabha representing the Kokrajhar constituency in Assam from 2014 to 2019 as an Independent Candidate and since 2019 as a member of Gana Suraksha Party. He won by the highest margin ever recorded in polls in Assam and as an independent candidate in the history of Lok Sabha elections.He is also  the founder and president of Gana Suraksha Party since 2019.Earlier, Saraniya was the commander of the 709 battalion of ULFA. He was said to be one of the most dreaded militants in Assam.

Family background
Saraniya’s father is dead and he is the eldest among four brothers and two sisters. Both sisters are in their twenties. The saraniyas own 15 bighas of land and are fairly well-off. They live in a typical Assamese house.

Militancy life in ULFA
Despite being the son of retired Indian army personnel, Naba joined the militant outfit ULFA in mid-1980s. In his militant life he was known as Heera Sarania. Heera was trained in Myanmar and Afghanistan. Sarania was the commander of ULFA's 709 Battalion.

The Diary
On 17 November 2005, 10 army personnel from the Dumuni cob (Company Operating Base) were able to recover Saraniya’s diary along with some arms, ammunitions, cash and cash-demand letter at Jala Gaon in the newly formed Baska district. The diary reveals Bhutan’s one-time collusion with the outfit and the ULFA’s deep-seated ire against India. Journalist Teresa Rehman claimed that she got the diary of Heera Sarania.

Arrest
On 20 August 2012, Guwahati city police arrested Heera Saraniya along with 3 other persons in charge of robbery, kidnap and murder.
Similarly a case has been registered against him on 9 Oct., 2020 at Kokrajhar police station.

See also
Tapan Baruah
Bijoy Chinese
List of top leaders of ULFA
Sanjukta Mukti Fouj

References

ULFA members
Living people
Lok Sabha members from Assam
India MPs 2014–2019
People from Baksa district
1969 births
Independent politicians in India
India MPs 2019–present